Rhododendron siderophyllum (锈叶杜鹃) is a rhododendron species native to Guizhou, Sichuan and Yunnan, China, where it grows at altitudes of 1800–3000 meters. It is a shrub that grows to 1–4 m in height, with leaves that are elliptic or elliptic-lanceolate, 3–7 by 1.2–3.5 cm in size. Flowers range from white to pink to pale purple or red.

Synonyms 
 Rhododendron ioanthum Balf. f.
 Rhododendron jahandiezii H. Lév.
 Rhododendron leucandrum H. Lév.
 Rhododendron obscurum Franch. ex Balf. f.
 Rhododendron rubropunctatum H. Lév. & Vaniot

References 
 "Rhododendron siderophyllum", Franchet, J. Bot. (Morot). 12: 262. 1898.
 The Plant List
 Flora of China
 Hirsutum.com

siderophyllum